Joseph Mould Adcock (10 March 1864 – 24 January 1914) was an English-born cricketer who played one match of first-class cricket for Nelson in New Zealand in 1891. He also represented South Canterbury against touring cricket teams in 1903 and 1906.

Adcock was an Anglican clergyman. He was ordained as a deacon in 1890 and as a priest in 1892. He served as domestic chaplain to the Bishop of Nelson, and was the curate at Brightwater, then Motueka. He returned to England to study at St Catharine's College, Cambridge, graduating MA in 1903. He returned to New Zealand, serving at Timaru and Temuka. In 1910 he again returned to England, where he was rector of Willesborough from 1911 until his death in 1914. He died after contracting typhoid fever in Switzerland.

References

External links
 
 

1864 births
1914 deaths
Sportspeople from Tamworth, Staffordshire
Alumni of St Catharine's College, Cambridge
New Zealand cricketers
Nelson cricketers
20th-century Church of England clergy
Deaths from typhoid fever
People from Willesborough
Infectious disease deaths in England